Vincent Poirier (born 17 October 1993) is a French professional basketball player for Real Madrid of the Spanish Liga ACB and the France basketball team.

Professional career

Europe

Poirier started to play basketball in May 2010 at the Bussy Basket Club. In the 2013–14 season, he finished as the top rebounder of the Espoirs championship, averaging 12 points and 10.8 rebounds in 27 minutes over 30 games.

On 24 April 2014, he signed a three-year deal with Paris-Levallois, but was loaned to Hyères-Toulon of the Pro B. He started the season being a solid rotation player with Davante Gardner. On 14 February 2015, he contributed against Angers by finishing the game with 10 points and 4 rebounds in just 10 minutes.

For the 2015–16 season, he returned to Paris-Levallois. From December onward, he was subject to a special designation allowing him to be able to play both with Paris-Levallois, and with CFBB in National 1. In December 2015, Frédéric Fauthoux replaced Antoine Rigaudeau as coach, which allowed Poirier a greater chance to show his potential. In April 2016, he was named MVP of the Round after finishing the match against BCM Gravelines-Dunkerque with 23 points, 12 rebounds and 2 assists in 25 minutes, when he started the game as a backup.

In July 2016, he participated in the NBA Summer League with Orlando Magic. In his first game, he finished with 6 points, 5 rebounds and 1 assist in 15 minutes. Over five games, he averaged 4.2 points, 4.4 rebounds, 0.6 assists and 0.4 blocks in 11.5 minutes per game. On 11 September 2016, as part of the pre-season, he and his team won the Sarthe/Pays de la Loire trophy in a three-team tournament by beating Le Mans and Antwerp.

On 14 June 2017, Poirier signed a three-year deal with Baskonia of the Spanish Liga ACB and the EuroLeague. In the 2018–19 season, Poirier led the EuroLeague in rebounding, averaging 8.3 per game. On May 10, 2019, Poirier earned a spot in the All-EuroLeague Second Team.

NBA
On 15 July 2019, Poirier parted ways with Baskonia to sign a contract with the Boston Celtics.

On 19 November 2020, Poirier was traded to the Oklahoma City Thunder for a conditional future second-round pick. On 8 December, Poirier along with Danny Green and Terrance Ferguson, were traded to the Philadelphia 76ers.

On 25 March 2021, Poirier was traded to the New York Knicks in a three-team trade involving the Oklahoma City Thunder and was waived four days later.

Real Madrid
On 12 April 2021, Poirier signed a deal with Real Madrid until the end of the 2023–24 season.

Career statistics

EuroLeague

|-
| style="text-align:left;"|2017–18
| style="text-align:left;" rowspan="2"|Baskonia
| 34 || 23 || 17.9 || .573 ||  || .725 || 5.2 || 1.0 || .6 || .9 || 8.2 || 10.9
|-
| style="text-align:left;"|2018–19
| 34 || 26 || 25.6 || .617 ||  || .731 || style="background:#cfecec;"|8.3 || 1.1 || .8 || .8 || 11.9 || 17.7
|- class="sortbottom"
| style="text-align:center;" colspan="2"|Career
| 68 || 49 || 21.8 || .599 ||  || .728 || 6.8 || 1.0 || .7 || .8 || 10.1 || 14.3

NBA

Regular season

|-
| style="text-align:left;"|
| style="text-align:left;"|Boston
| 22 || 0 || 5.9 || .472 || .500 || .857 || 2.0 || .4 || .1 || .4 || 1.9
|-
| style="text-align:left;"|
| style="text-align:left;"|Philadelphia
| 10 || 0 || 3.9 || .250 || .000 || .333 || 1.4 || .2 || .0 || .3 || 0.8
|- class="sortbottom"
| style="text-align:center;" colspan="2"|Career
| 32 || 0 || 5.3 || .417 || .333 || .615 || 1.8 || .3 || .1 || .4 || 1.5

Playoffs

|-
| style="text-align:left;"|2020
| style="text-align:left;"|Boston
| 1 || 0 || 2.0 ||  ||  ||  || .0 || 1.0 || 1.0 || .0 || .0
|- class="sortbottom"
| style="text-align:center;" colspan="2"|Career
| 1 || 0 || 2.0 ||  ||  ||  || .0 || 1.0 || 1.0 || .0 || .0

Awards and accomplishments

Professional career
 French Cup champion: 2013
 Match des Champions champion: 2013

Individual awards
 Best rebounder of the Espoirs championship: 2013–14
 EuroLeague rebounding leader: 2018–19

References

External links

 Vincent Poirier at eurobasket.com
 Vincent Poirier at euroleague.net
 Vincent Poirier at lequipe.fr 
 Vincent Poirier at lnb.fr 

1993 births
Living people
2019 FIBA Basketball World Cup players
Basketball players at the 2020 Summer Olympics
Boston Celtics players
Centre Fédéral de Basket-ball players
Centers (basketball)
French expatriate basketball people in Spain
French expatriate basketball people in the United States
French men's basketball players
HTV Basket players
Liga ACB players
Maine Red Claws players
Medalists at the 2020 Summer Olympics
Metropolitans 92 players
National Basketball Association players from France
Olympic basketball players of France
Olympic medalists in basketball
Olympic silver medalists for France
People from Clamart
Philadelphia 76ers players
Power forwards (basketball)
Saski Baskonia players
Sportspeople from Hauts-de-Seine
Undrafted National Basketball Association players